Maurolicus imperatorius, commonly knowns as the Emperor seamount lightfish, is a species of ray-finned fish in the genus Maurolicus. It lives in the North Pacific.

References 

Fish described in 1993
Sternoptychidae
Fish of the North Pacific